The 1981 Hong Kong Urban Council election was held on 5 March 1981 for the six of the 12 elected seats of the Urban Council of Hong Kong. Only about 6,195 of the 34,381 voters, cast their ballots in the election, accounting for 18 per cent turnout rate, breaking the record as the lowest turnout rate in history until the 1989 Urban & Regional Council elections.

It was the last Urban Council election with the limited franchise. Before the election, the government announced a major reform of the Urban Council to expand electorate to all Hong Kong permanent residents over 21 in the next year in 1983, which made the term of the elected members in this election only two years.

Overview of outcome

References

Hong Kong
1981 in Hong Kong
Urban and Regional
1981 elections in the British Empire
March 1981 events in Asia